The 1993–94 Villanova Wildcats men's basketball team represented Villanova University in the 1993–94 season.  The head coach was Steve Lappas.  The team played its home games at The Pavilion in Villanova, Pennsylvania, and was a member of the Big East Conference.

Roster

Schedule

|-
!colspan=9 style="background:#013974; color:#67CAF1;"| Non-Conference Regular Season

|-
!colspan=9 style="background:#013974; color:#67CAF1;"| Big East Conference Regular Season

|-
!colspan=9 style="background:#013974; color:#67CAF1;"| Non-Conference Regular Season

|-
!colspan=9 style="background:#013974; color:#67CAF1;"| Big East Conference Regular Season

|-
!colspan=9 style="background:#013974; color:#67CAF1;"| Non-Conference Regular Season

|-
!colspan=9 style="background:#013974; color:#67CAF1;"| Big East Conference Regular Season

|-
!colspan=9 style="background:#013974; color:#67CAF1;"| Non-Conference Regular Season

|-
!colspan=9 style="background:#013974; color:#67CAF1;"| Big East Conference Regular Season

|-
!colspan=9 style="background:#013974; color:#67CAF1;"| Big East tournament

|-
!colspan=9 style="background:#013974; color:#67CAF1;"| NIT

Awards and honors

Team players drafted into the NBA

References 

Villanova Wildcats men's basketball seasons
Villanova
Villanova
National Invitation Tournament championship seasons
Villanova